Mihail Petrov (born 1 July 1986) is a Bulgarian footballer who currently plays as a midfielder for Vitosha Bistritsa. He previously played for Sportist Svoge, Akademik Sofia, Dorostol Silistra, Slivnishki Geroy Slivnitsa and Chavdar Etropole.

References

External links
 

1986 births
Living people
Bulgarian footballers
FC Sportist Svoge players
Akademik Sofia players
FC Botev Vratsa players
PFC Dobrudzha Dobrich players
FC Vitosha Bistritsa players
FC Chavdar Etropole players
Association football midfielders
First Professional Football League (Bulgaria) players